Frederic Hilbert (October 15, 1912 – July 4, 2014) was an American politician from the state of Michigan. He served in the Michigan State Senate from 1961 to 1964.

References

Republican Party Michigan state senators
American centenarians
Men centenarians
1912 births
2014 deaths